Leptolaimus is a genus of nematodes belonging to the family Leptolaimidae.

The genus has almost cosmopolitan distribution.

Species:

Leptolaimus acicula 
Leptolaimus affinis 
Leptolaimus alatus 
Leptolaimus alekseevi 
Leptolaimus ampullaceus 
Leptolaimus antarcticus 
Leptolaimus cangionensis 
Leptolaimus cupulatus 
Leptolaimus danicus 
Leptolaimus dififtinus 
Leptolaimus dimorphus 
Leptolaimus ditlevseni 
Leptolaimus donsi 
Leptolaimus elegans 
Leptolaimus exilis 
Leptolaimus fluvialis 
Leptolaimus formosus 
Leptolaimus gabinoi 
Leptolaimus gerlachi 
Leptolaimus harpaga 
Leptolaimus holovachovi 
Leptolaimus hormozganensis 
Leptolaimus hydrothermalis 
Leptolaimus kerguelensis 
Leptolaimus leptaleus 
Leptolaimus limicolus 
Leptolaimus longiseta 
Leptolaimus longispiculus 
Leptolaimus lorenzeni 
Leptolaimus luridus 
Leptolaimus macer 
Leptolaimus maximus 
Leptolaimus membranatus 
Leptolaimus meyer-reili 
Leptolaimus minutus 
Leptolaimus mixtus 
Leptolaimus nobilis 
Leptolaimus nonus 
Leptolaimus octavus 
Leptolaimus papilliger 
Leptolaimus paravenustus 
Leptolaimus pellucidus 
Leptolaimus plectoides 
Leptolaimus pocillus 
Leptolaimus praeclarus 
Leptolaimus primus 
Leptolaimus puccinelliae 
Leptolaimus pumicosus 
Leptolaimus pumilus 
Leptolaimus quartus 
Leptolaimus quintus 
Leptolaimus rivalis 
Leptolaimus sachalinensis 
Leptolaimus scotlandicus 
Leptolaimus sebastiani 
Leptolaimus secundus 
Leptolaimus septempapillatus 
Leptolaimus septimus 
Leptolaimus sergeevae 
Leptolaimus setiger 
Leptolaimus sextus 
Leptolaimus steineri 
Leptolaimus surdus 
Leptolaimus tenuis 
Leptolaimus tertius 
Leptolaimus trichodes 
Leptolaimus tritubulatus 
Leptolaimus venustus 
Leptolaimus vinnulus 
Leptolaimus vipriensis 
Leptolaimus vitielloi

References

Nematodes